Kenneth Andrew Charles Benjamin (born 19 March 1955) is a Caribbean jurist. A dual national of Guyana and Antigua and Barbuda, he served as Chief Justice of Belize from 15 September 2011 to 20 March 2020.

Career
Benjamin was born on 19 March 1955 in Georgetown, Guyana. In 1980 and 1981, Benjamin served as a magistrate in Georgetown, Guyana. He went on to serve as Assistant Judge Advocate for the Guyana Defence Force. From 1988, he continued his work as a judge in Antigua, including from 1991 to 1993 as Chief Magistrate of Antigua. Following that, he was named as a judge of the High Court of the Eastern Caribbean Supreme Court. In this capacity he served in Montserrat and the British Virgin Islands in the succeeding years. From 2002 to 2007, Benjamin's position as ECSC High Court Judge took him to Grenada; he was succeeded there by Francis Cumberbatch. In 2007, he relocated to St. Lucia to become the presiding judge of the High Court of St. Lucia's criminal division.

In July 2011, following the retirement of Abdulai Conteh, Attorney-General B. Q. Pitts announced that Benjamin would be Belize's new Chief Justice. In the interim, Samuel Lungole Awich served as acting CJ. Pitts indicated his hopes that Benjamin, at the time 56, would be able to hold his position until he reached the mandatory retirement age of 65.

Personal life
Benjamin graduated from the Hugh Wooding Law School of the University of the West Indies in Trinidad and Tobago in 1977. He is married and has a daughter and a son.

References

1955 births
Living people
Antigua and Barbuda judges
Eastern Caribbean Supreme Court justices
Chief justices of Belize
20th-century Guyanese judges
University of the West Indies alumni
Antigua and Barbuda judges on the courts of Grenada
Antigua and Barbuda judges on the courts of Saint Lucia
Antigua and Barbuda people of Guyanese descent
Guyanese people of Antigua and Barbuda descent
Guyanese judges on the courts of Grenada
Guyanese judges on the courts of Saint Lucia
Antigua and Barbuda judges on the courts of Belize
Guyanese judges on the courts of Belize
Antigua and Barbuda judges on the courts of Anguilla
Antigua and Barbuda judges on the courts of Montserrat
Guyanese judges on the courts of Anguilla
Guyanese judges on the courts of Montserrat
Guyanese judges of international courts and tribunals
Antigua and Barbuda judges of international courts and tribunals
21st-century Guyanese judges